Syed Zainol Anwar ibni Syed Putra Jamalullail (born 1952), better known as Syed Anwar Jamalullail is a Malaysian businessman and member of Perlis Royal Family. He is the younger brother of the current Raja of Perlis, Tuanku Syed Sirajuddin.

Early life and education 
Syed Zainol Anwar was born in 1952. He is the younger son of the third Yang di-Pertuan Agong (King) of Malaysia and the sixth Raja of Perlis, Tuanku Syed Putra and Raja Perempuan Budriah.

He holds a Bachelor of Arts degree in Accounting from Macquarie University in Sydney, Australia. He is a qualified Chartered Accountant, having qualified in 1974. He is also a Chartered Accountant, a Certified Practising Accountant (Australia) and a member of the Malaysian Institute of Accountants.

Career 
He began his career with Malaysian Airlines System Berhad in 1975 as a Financial Accountant, before moving on to hold executive senior positions in various companies. His last position was as the Group Managing Director of Amanah Capital Partners Berhad.

He was formerly the Chairman of the Lembaga Tabung Haji Investment Panel, Cahaya Mata Sarawak Berhad, Malaysian Airport Holdings Berhad, Media Prima Berhad, Malaysian Resources Corporation Berhad, DRB-Hicom Berhad, Malakoff Corporation Berhad, EON Bank Berhad, Uni Asia Life Assurance Berhad, Uni Asia General Insurance Berhad, Radicare (M) Sdn Bhd and Realmild (M) Sdn Bhd. He was also an Independent Director of Maxis Communications Berhad and Bangkok Bank Berhad, and the Group Managing Director of Amanah Capital Partners Berhad.

Currently, he is the Chairman of SP Setia Berhad, Nestle (Malaysia) Berhad, Kenanga Investment Bank Berhad and Lembaga Zakat Selangor. He is also the Chancellor of SEGi University.

Personal life 
On the 5th April 1979, he married Tengku Puteri Nor Zehan, the youngest sister of the current Sultan of Selangor, Sultan Sharafuddin Idris Shah. They have three children: Syed Haizam Hishamuddin Putra, Syed Jufri Ziauddin Putra and Sharifa Eliza Cornelia Putri.

Honours 
He has been awarded :

Honours of Perlis
  :
  Knight Grand Commander of the Order of the Crown of Perlis (SPMP) - Dato' Seri (1995)
 Knight Grand Companion of the Order of the Gallant Prince Syed Putra Jamalullail (SSPJ) - Dato' Seri Diraja (1999)

Honours of Malaysia
  :
  Commander of the Order of Loyalty to the Crown of Malaysia (PSM) – Tan Sri (2006)
  :
  Knight Grand Companion of the Order of Sultan Sharafuddin Idris Shah (SSIS) - Dato' Setia (2003)
  Royal Family Order of Selangor (DK II) (2015)

References

Malaysian businesspeople
Malaysian people of Malay descent
House of Jamalullail of Perlis
1952 births
Living people
Commanders of the Order of Loyalty to the Crown of Malaysia
Sons of monarchs